Adhesins are proteins on the surface of living cells that allow the organism to colonize various surfaces and may refer to:

Adhesin molecule (immunoglobulin -like)
Bacterial adhesin
Fungal adhesin

See also
Adhesion (disambiguation)
Cell adhesion